Strike at Heart is a Hong Kong period wuxia television series based on Woon Swee Oan's novel, A Spear of Alarm produced by TVB. The series stars Joe Ma, Sunny Chan, Stephen Au, Charmaine Sheh, Nnadia Chan, and Annie Man. It was filmed in 2004 and released overseas in January 2005. Then it was aired in Hong Kong on TVB Pay Vision's TVB Drama channel from 27 May to 23 June 2009.

Plot
Chu Kot Ching Ngor (Joe Ma), Yuen Sap Sam Han (Stephen Au), and hermit Tin Yee (Sunny Chan) are apprentices to the same clique. They have not seen each other for a long time. During a rare gathering, they end up at daggers drawn.

They studied in the same clique when they were young and became good friends. Due to physical constraint, Tin Yee was unsuited to Martial Arts so he turned to studying yin yang and five material agents. Chu Kot and Yuen were born to learn Martial Arts. Yuen's lifetime goal is to become the best fighter in the Martial Arts World. However, he could never beat Chu Kot before he left the clique, which bothered him enormously.

Chu Kot worked for the imperial government after he left the clique. Yuen lived a quiet life practicing Martial Arts in the hope of defeating Chu Kot one day. When Yuen reappears in the Martial Arts World, Chu Kot has become renowned and is known as Mr. Chu Kot. His immediate mission is to fight against a corrupt official Choi King (Shek Sau). Because of Choi King, Chu Kot cannot avoid having an ultimate fight with Yuen. During the fight, Yuen uses his "Heartbroken Arrow" while Chu Kot fights back with his "Strike at Heart".

In fact, Chu Kot has never really wanted to fight with Yuen. Under the vossludes of fortune, they both fall in love with a gentle and cheerful girl named Siu Keng (Charmaine Sheh).

Cast
 Note: Some of the characters' names are in Cantonese romanisation.

Main cast

Other cast

See also
 List of TVB series (2005)

TVB dramas
Hong Kong wuxia television series
2005 Hong Kong television series debuts
2005 Hong Kong television series endings
2009 Hong Kong television series debuts
2009 Hong Kong television series endings
2013 Hong Kong television series debuts
2013 Hong Kong television series endings
Adaptations of works by Woon Swee Oan